Mwijukye Francis is a Ugandan politician and legislator, representing Buhweju County, in the Parliament of Uganda.

Politics
He has been a strong FDC member and had contested for three times before his first term in 2017. In 2019, he was elected the parliamentary commissioner representing the FDC.

Education
He went to Bwoga primary school, St. Mukasa seminary primary School, to St Joseph vocational School for both Uganda Certificate of Education and Uganda Advanced Certificate of Education and later joined Mbarara University, MUST, where he did Development Studies.

Politics
He has been a strong FDC member and had contested for three times before his first term in 2017. In 2019, he was elected the parliamentary commissioner representing the FDC.
He also told a line of ministers in charge of security to resign due to the mass killing of twenty-one women in Wakiso district, by assailants.

In 2016, he joined Parliament after beating the then incumbent Ephraim Biraaro.

In 2021, he opposed the promise by President Yoweri Museveni to pay biology teachers 4 million shillings and history teachers 700,000 shillings.

He also survived poison in his food at a time he was campaigning in his constituency during the 2021 general elections.

He recently survived a fatal accident, though he had also survived poison he ate within his food, during his 2020 election campaign.

He is currently a shadow cabinet Minister for trade and industry.

References 

Members of the Parliament of Uganda
Forum for Democratic Change politicians
21st-century Ugandan politicians
Buhweju District
Mbarara University alumni
1983 births
Living people